The National Guard of Ukraine went through three stages in its evolution into the entity we see today. This is reflected in the type of weaponry used: from that of a standing army inherited from the first National Guard (1991–2000), to SWAT type weapons during its role as an internal police (2000–2014), to back to a military force that is armed lighter than the army but also can respond faster.

Weapons

Vehicles

Tanks

Infantry fighting vehicle

Armoured personnel carrier

Artillery

Utility vehicles

Trucks

Buses

Aircraft

See also

List of equipment of the Ukrainian Ground Forces

References

Ukrainian National Guard
Military equipment of Ukraine
National Guard of Ukraine